Francisco Javier Pedraza Abrilot (born 6 July 1988) is a Chilean footballer who plays as a right midfielder.

Career
As a youth player, Pedraza was with Everton and next he moved to Santiago Wanderers, making his debut in 22 July 2007 in a 1–0 win against Universidad Católica. For the team, he made appearances in the top division in both the 2007 and the 2011 seasons.

After stints on loan at Unión Quilpué, Trasandino, Deportes Temuco and Deportes Linares, he emigrated to Bolivia.

His first team was Chaco Petrolero, playing after for Escuela Militar Ingeniería (EMI), Always Ready, Deportivo FATIC and Unión Maestranza. In Deportivo FATIC, he coincided with his compatriot Roberto Luco.

Controversies
In October 2012, Pedraza was stabbed in the back in the context of a fight at a party when he was a player of Deportes Temuco.

In 2013, Pedraza was accused of rape when he was a player of Deportes Linares. In 28 July 2021 he was arrested in Bolivia and then extradited to Chile to go on the court case.

References

External links
 
 Francisco Pedraza at MemoriaWanderers 

1988 births
Living people
Sportspeople from Viña del Mar
Chilean footballers
Chilean expatriate footballers
Santiago Wanderers footballers
Unión Quilpué footballers
Trasandino footballers
Deportes Temuco footballers
Deportes Linares footballers
Chaco Petrolero players
Club Always Ready players
Chilean Primera División players
Primera B de Chile players
Tercera División de Chile players
Segunda División Profesional de Chile players
Chilean expatriate sportspeople in Bolivia
Expatriate footballers in Bolivia
Association football midfielders